Cobh Ramblers Football Club (CRFC) is an Irish football club. The club, founded in 1922 and elected to the League of Ireland in 1985, hails from Cobh, County Cork and play their home matches at St. Colman's Park. The club's colours are claret and blue. The club was a founding member of the Cork Athletic Union League in 1947 and is the only one of the 14 founding clubs still in existence today.

History

Cobh Ramblers was originally a field hockey club, and until the British withdrawal from Ireland, many club members played football with the British Army soldiers who were stationed at Cobh. This led to the re-formation of Cobh Ramblers as a football club.

Founded in 1922, Cobh Ramblers Football Club first won the Munster Senior Cup in 1925. Additional (provincial) Munster Senior Cup titles were captured in the 1930s, 1940s, 1950s and 1970s.

At a national level, the club played in the 1976 FAI League Cup, reaching the semi finals.

Cobh Ramblers joined the League of Ireland in 1985, after many years as a Munster Senior League side. One of the most successful of those teams was the team of 1983, who got to the semi final of the FAI Cup humbling many senior clubs on the way. They met Sligo Rovers in the semi-final that year and captured the imagination of the Irish footballing public, drawing crowds of over 20,000 to Flower Lodge for the home games as St Colmans Park was too small. There were 3 replays until Sligo finally won 3–2 and went on to win the Cup.

Cobh won promotion to the Premier Division in 1988, after finishing First Division runners-up to Athlone Town. Lasting just one season in the top flight, they won promotion again at the end of the 1992–93 season, this time as runners-up to Galway United. A play-off win over Finn Harps saw Ramblers retain their Premier Division status at the end of the 1993–94 season, but the club were relegated in second-last place the following year.

With Ramblers having played all but four of their League of Ireland campaigns in the First Division, they rarely get to play their local rivals Cork City, a Premier Division team, with the two usually only being able to match up in pre-season friendlies and the occasional cup match, Cobh being the minnows in terms of League of Ireland experience.

In recent years, fan numbers have not been as high as they were during the glory days when Ramblers were in the top flight of Irish football and playing glamorous pre-season matches against the likes of Celtic and Arsenal. Though even with its lower attendance at home matches (usually about 600 or so, over 1000 for the 2008 season), the fans in attendance are loyal and take part in club fund-raisers and events as well as watching the match. It is hoped though that with a new younger generation becoming interested in the League of Ireland, due to promotion of the league and sport as a whole, that attendance and the fortunes of the club might improve.

Ramblers appeared on live television for the first time on Friday, 10 November 2006 in an away fixture at Galway United, where they lost 1–0.

On 10 November 2007 Cobh Ramblers beat Athlone Town 1–0 in Lissywoollen in what was a tense and nervous display. This victory gave Cobh Ramblers their first piece of Senior Silverware and crowned them First Division Champions. During the 2007 season, with their young squad, they recorded a 27-game unbeaten run, keeping 22 clean sheets. Their points tally of 77 points was also a record for the league.

However, after suffering relegation from the League of Ireland Premier Division, Ramblers subsequently failed to obtain a licence for the First Division due to financial constraints and so compete in the Newstalk A Championship (Ireland's third tier).

In 2010 Ramblers missed out on gaining promotion back to the League of Ireland losing to Salthill Devon in a play off.

The Ramblers most noted past player is former Irish international and Manchester United star Roy Keane, while Irish international Stephen Ireland is a product of the Youth System. Westlife singer Nicky Byrne, who was also a footballer on the books at Leeds United, had a spell with the club too.

On 18 March 2014, the club parted company with manager Dave Hill by mutual consent after five years. He was replaced by Martin Cambridge on an interim basis. In March 2015 Martin Cambridge tendered his resignation and Stephen Henderson returned to the club as first team manager. In Oct 2015 Stephen Henderson signed a new three-year contract with the club. In 2016 Henderson guided Ramblers to munster senior cup victory and to a 3rd-place finish in the first division. Cobh Ramblers were the only side to defeat first division champions Limerick that season and this coincided with a run of 5 victories in their last 5 league games to reach the playoffs. They narrowly lost 3–2 on aggregate to Drogheda Utd despite overturning a 2–0 deficit in the return leg at United Park after only nine minutes.

In 2018, Ramblers reached the final of the EA Sports Cup Final. In the semi final they defeated Dundalk 1–0 at home with striker Chris Hull scoring the winner. After defeating Dundalk, and denying the eventual champions a treble, Ramblers lost the final away to Derry City 3–1.

Stadium

St Colman's Park was redeveloped during the mid-2000s. Construction of a new state of the art changing facility and press office along with a new Chairman's office was completed in 2006 along with new floodlights and a 900-seater stand replacing the old shed. The east stand, too has seen improvement with 450 new seats being installed. Plans for a new 900 seater stand adjacent to the existing stand have temporarily been put on hold due to minor financial difficulties at the club. A new slick surface was also added prior to the clubs admission to the Eircom/Airtricity League Premier Division in 2009.

The stadium has hosted international underage games including games in the 1994 UEFA European Under-16 Football Championship qualifiers.

Munster Schools Senior Cup games have also been staged at the stadium including the final which was won by local Cobh school, Coláiste Muire in 2010.

Current squad

Youth teams

Under-19s
The National under-19 league was introduced in 2011, replacing the old A Championship. Cobh Ramblers won the Southern Division that year, gaining promotion to the Elite Division. During the 2022 season, the Cobh's under-19 team secured the LOI Tier 2 League title with a record of 14 wins and 4 draws from 18 games.

Under-17s
Cobh Ramblers entered a team in the first ever League of Ireland under-17 season in 2015. The side was made up of players from across the county of Cork. As of 2020, the under-17 side was coached by former Cork City F.C. and Cardiff City defender, Darren Dennehy.

Supporters
Cobh Ramblers fanbase, known as the "Claret and Blue Army", used to locate in the East stand, behind the goal. Nowadays they locate at the far end of the South stand. There is also a Cobh Ramblers Supporters Club, who are involved in fundraising for the club.

In 2019, Cobh Ramblers changed the ownership structure of the club and became a fully fan owned entity. Now operating under the guise of Cobh Ramblers Co-Operative Society.

Honours
League of Ireland First Division: 1
2007
EA Sports Cup: Runners-Up 1
Munster Senior League: 15
 1925–26, 1934–35, 1935–36, 1943–44, 1956–57, 1971–72, 1975–76, 1976–77, 1977–78, 1979–80, 1980–81, 1981–82, 1982–83, 1983–84, 1984–85
Munster Senior Cup: 5
 1924–25, 1943–44, 1978–79, 1982–83, 2015–16, 2021-22
FAI Intermediate Cup: 2
 1979–80, 1982–83
Enda McGuill Cup: 1
 2013–14
Munster Youths Cup: 3
 1989–90, 1993–94, 1999-0

Notable former managers
  Alfie Hale (1988–1989)
  Damien Richardson (1995)
  Ian Butterworth (1998)
  Dave Hill (2009–2014)
  Stephen Henderson (2004–2008) (2015–2019)

Notable former players
  Roy Keane 
  Nicky Byrne 
  David Meyler 
  Jaze Kabia 
  Jason Kabia 
  Colin Falvey 
  John Hollins 
  Stephen Ireland 
  Graham Cummins
  Michael Devine (footballer)

References

External links

 
Association football clubs established in 1922
Association football clubs in County Cork
Former League of Ireland Premier Division clubs
A Championship teams
1922 establishments in Ireland
Cobh
League of Ireland First Division clubs
Former Munster Senior League (association football) clubs
Former Cork Athletic Union League clubs